{{DISPLAYTITLE:C12H11N3}}
The molecular formula C12H11N3 (molar mass: 197.24 g/mol, exact mass: 197.0953 u) may refer to:

 Aniline Yellow, a yellow azo dye and an aromatic amine
 1,3-Diphenyltriazene, organic compound